East Branch Roaring Brook is a tributary of Roaring Brook in Wayne County and Lackawanna County, in Pennsylvania in the United States. Wild trout naturally reproduce within the stream and many macroinvertebrate taxa inhabit it. The surficial geology in the area consists of Wisconsinan Till, Wisconsinan Ice-Contact Stratified Drift, alluvium, bedrock, fill, sand and gravel pits, and wetlands.

Course
East Branch Roaring Brook begins in a pond near Freytown, in Sterling Township, Wayne County. It flows north for a short distance before turning southwest and exiting Wayne County. Upon exiting Wayne County, the stream enters Madison Township, Lackawanna County. It very briefly passes through the southernmost corner of that township and enters Covington Township. After a few tenths of a mile, it turns west-northwest and enters a wetland. It then turns west-northwest for several tenths of a mile before turning northwest for several tenths of a mile and then turning south. The stream turns west-northwest for several tenths of a mile before turning north and then southwest. After several tenths of a mile, it turns northwest and reaches its confluence with Roaring Brook at the Hollister Reservoir.

Geography and geology

The surficial geology in the vicinity of the lower reaches of East Branch Roaring Brook alluvium, Wisconsinan Ice-Contact Stratified Drift, bedrock consisting of conglomeratic sandstone and sandstone and shale, fill, and  sand and gravel pits. Further upstream, the surficial geology mainly consists of a glacial or resedimented till known as Wisconsinan Till. However, there are large patches of wetland and smaller patches of bedrock and alluvium.

Watershed 
The stream is entirely within the United States Geological Survey quadrangle of Sterling.

East Branch Roaring Brook is a major tributary of Roaring Brook. There are Exceptional Value wetlands in the stream's vicinity. A reservoir known as Small Potential Reservoir #37-9 was proposed in the State Water Plan in 1978. It was intended to be a multipurpose structure.

History
East Branch Roaring Brook was entered into the Geographic Names Information System on August 2, 1979. Its identifier in the Geographic Names Information System is 1173767.

The PPL Corporation has received a permit to construct an electric aerial line over East Branch Roaring Brook and nearby wetlands.

Biology
Wild trout naturally reproduce in East Branch Roaring Brook from river mile 2.48 downstream to its mouth. The stream meets the criteria to be an Exceptional Value waters candidate. The creek is considered to be a High-Quality Coldwater Fishery.

Numerous macroinvertebrate taxa have been observed in East Branch Roaring Brook, including 17 genera from the orders Ephemeroptera, Plecoptera, and Trichoptera. In a 212-individual sample taken near the stream's mouth, the most common taxa included the genus Epeorus (49 individuals), the genus Ephemerella (43 individuals), the genus Hydropsyche (20 individuals), the family Chironomidae (11 individuals), and the genus Nigronia (10 individuals). Less common taxa included the genus Psephenus (9 individuals), the genus Rhyacophila (9 individuals), the genus Acroneuria (8 individuals), the genus Neophylax (8 individuals), the genus Hexatoma (6 individuals), and the genus Agapetus (5 individuals). Rarer taxa included the genus Argentina (4 individuals); the genera Baetis, Stenonema, and Paraleptophlebia (3 individuals each); and the genus Cambarus. Only one individual each of several genera were observed: Drunella, Pteronarcys, Pycnopsyche, Promoresia, and Prosimulium.

See also
Bear Brook (Roaring Brook), next tributary of Roaring Brook going downstream
Lake Run, next tributary of Roaring Brook going upstream
List of rivers of Pennsylvania
List of tributaries of the Lackawanna River

References

Rivers of Lackawanna County, Pennsylvania
Rivers of Wayne County, Pennsylvania
Tributaries of Roaring Brook (Lackawanna River)
Rivers of Pennsylvania